The 2016–17 season was FC Banants's sixteenth consecutive season in the Armenian Premier League. The club finished the previous season in 5th and reached the Semifinal of the Armenian Cup.

Squad

Transfers

In

Out

Loans out

Released

Competitions

Overall record

Premier League

Results summary

Results

Table

Armenian Cup

UEFA Europa League

Qualifying rounds

Statistics

Appearances and goals

|-
|colspan="14"|Players who left Banants during the season:

|}

Goal scorers

Clean sheets

Disciplinary Record

Notes

References

FC Urartu seasons
Banants